Philadelphia, Pennsylvania has three rapid transit lines: two operated by the Southeastern Pennsylvania Transportation Authority (SEPTA) and one by the Port Authority Transit Corporation (PATCO). The two SEPTA lines operate entirely within Philadelphia, while the PATCO line connects Philadelphia and Camden County, New Jersey.

Market–Frankford Line

Broad Street Line

PATCO Speedline
The PATCO Speedline connects to eight other stations outside of Philadelphia.

See also
 List of metro systems

References

Philadelphia 
Philadelphia